People Power Party may refer to:
 
People Power (Australia)
People Power Victoria – No Smart Meters (Australia)
People Power (Hong Kong)
People Power–League of Social Democrats (Hong Kong)
People Power Coalition (Philippines)
Partido Lakas ng Tao (People Power Party), predecessor of Lakas–CMD (1991)  (Philippines)
Lakas–CMD
People Power Party (South Korea)

See also
 People's Power Party (disambiguation)
 People Power (disambiguation)

th:พรรคพลังประชาชน (แก้ความกำกวม)